The 1980 United States Senate election in Iowa was held on November 4, 1980. Incumbent Democratic United States Senator John Culver ran for reelection to a second term, but lost to Republican nominee Chuck Grassley, the United States Congressman from Iowa's 3rd congressional district. This election marked the beginning of, as of 2022, 8 consecutive victories for Grassley in the Senate, and remains the closest election of his Senate career.

Democratic primary

Candidates 
 John Culver, incumbent United States Senator

Results

Republican primary

Candidates 
 Chuck Grassley, United States Congressman from Iowa's 3rd congressional district
 Tom Stoner

Results

General election

Results

See also 
 1980 United States Senate elections

References 

1980 Iowa elections
Iowa
1980